Eatonina is a genus of minute sea snails, marine gastropod mollusks in the family Cingulopsidae.

Species
Species within the genus Eatonina include:

 Eatonina albachiarae Perugia, 2011 
 Eatonina ardeae Ponder & Yoo, 1980
 Eatonina atomaria (Powell, 1933)
 Eatonina capricornea (Hedley, 1907)
 Eatonina caribaea (Faber, 2005)
 Eatonina colorata Ponder & Yoo, 1980
 Eatonina condita Ponder & Yoo, 1980
 Eatonina cossurae (Calcara, 1841)
 Eatonina crassicarinata (Powell, 1937)
 Eatonina dilecta (Turton, 1932)
 Eatonina fulgida (Adams J., 1797)
 Eatonina fulvicolumella Ponder & Yoo, 1980
 Eatonina fusca (d'Orbigny, 1840)
 Eatonina fuscoelongata Rolán & Hernández, 2006
 Eatonina halia (Bartsch, 1915)
 Eatonina hedleyi Ponder & Yoo, 1980
 Eatonina heliciformis Ponder & Yoo, 1980
 Eatonina hutchingsae Ponder & Yoo, 1980
 Eatonina kitanagato Fukuda, Nakamura & Yamashita, 1998
 Eatonina lactea Ponder & Yoo, 1980
 Eatonina laurensi Moolenbeek & Faber, 1991
 Eatonina lirata Ponder & Yoo, 1980
 Eatonina lunata (Laseron, 1956)
 Eatonina maculosa Ponder, 1965
 Eatonina maickeli Rolán & Fernández-Garcés, 2015
 Eatonina martae Rolán & Templado, 1993
 Eatonina matildae Rubio & Rodriguez Babio, 1996
 Eatonina micans (Webster, 1905)
 Eatonina ochroleuca (Brusina, 1869)
 Eatonina ordofasciarum Rolán & Hernández, 2006
 Eatonina pulicaria (Fischer, 1873)
 Eatonina pumila (Monterosato, 1884)
 Eatonina pusilla (Thiele, 1912)
 Eatonina rubicunda Ponder & Yoo, 1980
 Eatonina rubrilabiata Ponder & Yoo, 1980
 Eatonina sanguinolenta Ponder & Yoo, 1980
 Eatonina shirleyae Ponder & Yoo, 1980
 Eatonina striata Ponder & Yoo, 1980
 Eatonina subflavescens (Iredale, 1915)
 Eatonina vermeuleni Moolenbeek, 1986
 Eatonina voorwindei Ponder & Yoo, 1980

Species brought into synonymy
 Eatonina celata (Monterosato, 1884): synonym of Eatonina fulgida (Adams J., 1797)
 Eatonina coelata (Monterosato, 1884): synonym of Eatonina fulgida (Adams J., 1797)

References

 Fretter V. & Patil A.M. 1958. A revision of the systematic position of the prosobranch gastropod Cingulopsis (= Cingula) fulgida (J. Adams). Proceedings of the Malacological Society of London 33: 114–126
 Tomlin J.R. le B. 1917. New name for Microsetia (preoccupied). Journal of Conchology, 15: 221
 Ponder W.F. (1965). A revision of the New Zealand recent species previously known as Notosetia Iredale, 1915 (Rissoidae, Gastropoda). Records of the Auckland Institute and Museum. 6(2): 101-131.
 Gofas, S.; Le Renard, J.; Bouchet, P. (2001). Mollusca, in: Costello, M.J. et al. (Ed.) (2001). European register of marine species: a check-list of the marine species in Europe and a bibliography of guides to their identification. Collection Patrimoines Naturels, 50: pp. 180–213
 Gofas, S.; Le Renard, J.; Bouchet, P. (2001). Mollusca. in: Costello, M.J. et al. (eds), European Register of Marine Species: a check-list of the marine species in Europe and a bibliography of guides to their identification. Patrimoines Naturels. 50: 180-213
 Spencer, H.G., Marshall, B.A. & Willan, R.C. (2009). Checklist of New Zealand living Mollusca. Pp 196-219. in: Gordon, D.P. (ed.) New Zealand inventory of biodiversity. Volume one. Kingdom Animalia: Radiata, Lophotrochozoa, Deuterostomia. Canterbury University Press, Christchurch

External links
 Monterosato T. A. (di) (1884). Nomenclatura generica e specifica di alcune conchiglie mediterranee. Palermo, Virzi, 152 pp.
 Ponder, W.F.; Yoo, E.K. (1981, 1980). A review of the genera of Cingulopsidae with a revision of the Australian and tropical Indo-Pacific species (Mollusca: Gastropoda: Prosobranchia). Records of the Australian Museum. 33: 1-88

Cingulopsidae